Rellstab is a surname. Notable people with the name include:

 Johann Carl Friedrich Rellstab (1759–1813), German composer, writer, music publisher, and critic
 John Rellstab (1858–1930), United States federal judge
 Ludwig Rellstab (1799–1860), German poet and music critic
 Ludwig Rellstab (chess player) (1904–1983), German chess player
 Tanya Rellstab Carreto (born 1978), Mexican politician